The 2010–11 season marked the return of Newcastle United to the Premier League following a season in the Championship. They finished in 12th place.

Newcastle's early season form was erratic on their return to English football's top tier, with thrashings of Aston Villa and local rivals Sunderland and exceptional away victories at Everton and Arsenal offset by home defeats against Blackpool, Blackburn Rovers and Stoke City.

After a win over Arsenal sent Newcastle to fifth in the league, the team went on a winless run that ended in the controversial sacking of manager Chris Hughton. The club swiftly appointed Alan Pardew, last of third-tier Southampton, although Newcastle fans were suspicious due to alleged links with the club's unpopular owners. Despite the club's form still being reasonable, the owner's popularity decreased further after the transfer deadline day sale of local hero Andy Carroll for £35 million to Liverpool. The club posted one of the league's most incredible results, drawing 4–4 draw with Arsenal at St James' Park after being 4–0 down at half-time.

Season summary

During the summer of 2010, Chris Hughton completed the signings of defender James Perch from Nottingham Forest, young midfielder Dan Gosling from Everton after an administrative error at Goodison Park allowed the 20-year-old to move to Newcastle on a free transfer and experienced centre-half Sol Campbell from Arsenal also on a free in preparation for life back in the Premier League. Towards the end of the transfer window, Ivory Coast international and defensive midfielder Cheick Tioté was also signed by the club from Twente for a reported £3.5 million, while Hatem Ben Arfa was brought in on a season long loan from Marseille for a reported £2 million, with the view of a permanent move for a further £5 million should he make more than 25 appearances for the club. This season also saw the departure of captain Nicky Butt, who opted to retire from football, and Fabrice Pancrate due to his contract expiring and no new deal being agreed.

Although the opening match of the season away to Manchester United saw the Magpies lose 3–0, they continue to remain unbeaten at St James' Park with a 6–0 victory over Aston Villa on 22 August 2010, which welcomed a hat-trick from the new number nine Andy Carroll, as well as Joey Barton shaving his moustache, which was part of the "Magpies Moustache Challenge". For their next match away at Wolverhampton Wanderers, they drew 1–1, Carroll again scoring with people calling for a call up to the senior England squad for the 21-year-old. After an international break, an excited, large crowd accumulated at a bouncing, atmospheric St James' Park for the following clash against Blackpool. A 2–0 defeat left the club ending their unbeaten record at St James' Park. New signing Tioté made his debut and Hatem Ben Arfa started his first game for the following match against Everton, while Sol Campbell was still not nearing match fitness. The game ended with a 1–0 victory, sending them to fifth position in the table. Newcastle continued their impressive run of form with an excellent and unexpected 4–3 win at Stamford Bridge against Chelsea in the League Cuo. The following league fixture saw Stoke City at St James' Park, which ended in a disappointing 2–1 defeat.

An away game to Manchester City followed seeing another 2–1 defeat for Newcastle, but also saw midfielder Hatem Ben Arfa suffer a horrific double leg break following a clash with City midfielder Nigel de Jong. The club demanded action on De Jong, claiming Ben Arfa faced a lengthy spell on the sidelines. Ben Arfa's agent also claimed that De Jong had not apologised to Ben Arfa. A 2–2 draw at St James' Park with Wigan Athletic followed, with ex-midfielder Charles N'Zogbia scoring the two openers for Wigan before a Shola Ameobi goal made it 2–1 with 15 minutes left, and in the dying seconds defender Fabricio Coloccini powered a header past goalkeeper Ali Al-Habsi to rescue a point for Newcastle.

The team got back on track after a three-game winless run when they defeated bottom of the table West Ham United 2–1 at Upton Park on 23 October. Newcastle had gone behind after only 12 minutes thanks to a Carlton Cole goal, but quickly turned things around with captain Kevin Nolan equalising ten minutes later and Andy Carroll grabbing the winner with 20 minutes left.

The club faced more controversy when striker Andy Carroll was arrested for a reported attack on his ex-girlfriend at her home in Newcastle, to which he pleaded self-defense. He was released on bail on 18 October.

Newcastle's good form was lost in a 2–1 defeat to Blackburn Rovers at home, going 1–0 down after just two minutes with a goal from Morten Gamst Pedersen. Striker Andy Carroll got an equaliser early in the second half only for Newcastle to go behind again late after a goal from Jason Roberts. Joey Barton received a three match ban for punching Gamst Pedersen and Shola Ameobi suffered a hamstring injury. Newcastle's poor home form continued after they played to a 0–0 draw against Fulham. Danny Guthrie replaced a suspended Barton only to be substituted for Wayne Routledge later on; Peter Løvenkrands replaced Ameobi who was then substituted for Nile Ranger. Carroll was given Man of the Match after getting many chances and good shots only for them to be blocked by Fulham goalkeeper Mark Schwarzer or cleared off the line.

Alan Pardew
Controversy once again hit the club as Chris Hughton was sacked on 6 December 2010 following Newcastle's 3–1 defeat to West Bromwich Albion. The Newcastle United board stated that "the board now feels an individual with more managerial experience is needed to take the club forward". Hughton's dismissal was an unpopular decision with the fans and the players, and was highly criticized by many pundits.

On 9 December 2010, Alan Pardew was named as his replacement. He expressed delight at the role and claimed he had nothing but respect for Hughton's achievements and insisted he was excited and looking forward to his new challenge at the club.

Pardew had a notable first game, seeing a 3–1 victory over Liverpool, however the Christmas period saw 2 matches lost to Manchester City and Tottenham. The squad regained form with a win over Wigan, and an energetic 5–0 win over his former club West Ham United F.C. The club was then however embarrassed by a 3–1 loss to League Two side Stevenage in the FA Cup third round.

Upon the transfer window opening, Pardew hinted at the possibility of bringing David Beckham to the club on a loan move from the LA Galaxy. It was also reported the club were looking to sign a striker, with Sebastian Larsson reported to be of interest. Pardew stated he wanted to sign two players following the defeat to Stevenage, and also insisted he wished for Alan Smith to stay with the club amid reports linking him with a return to Leeds United.

16 January 2011 saw Pardew's first Tyne–Wear derby in charge saw the Magpies gather a point after a disappointing 1–1 draw; Newcastle were on the front foot for much of the game and a 50th minute back-heel goal from skipper Kevin Nolan gave the away team a 1–0 lead, but Asamoah Gyan saved Sunderland from defeat with a 94th-minute goal after Steve Harper deflected a shot from Phil Bardsley into the path of the Ghanaian and Sunderland gained the point.

Newcastle would continue their undefeated form, but not how they would have like. On 22 January 2011, Newcastle faced Tottenham Hotspur at St James' Park. The game would be very much end-to-end throughout until Fabricio Coloccini opened the scoring to give Newcastle a 1–0 lead. However, another injury time goal from the opposition meant Newcastle had dropped another two points. Manager Alan Pardew has stated that the team had "committed too many bodies forward to try and get a second".

Spurs manager Harry Redknapp denied interest in bringing striker Andy Carroll to Tottenham. However, following two rejected bids from Liverpool, Carroll became the most expensive British player transfer in history as Liverpool signed a £35 million deal for the striker. Carroll's sale caused controversy for the club as manager Alan Pardew stated his regret at losing Carroll, insisting he wanted a new contract and was not pushed out by the club, while Carroll contradicted Pardew's claim, stating he did not want to go but was forced by managing director Derek Llambias to hand in a transfer request. Pardew stated the £35m received from Liverpool had been promised to him for summer transfer funds for the 2012 season.

Stephen Ireland then joined the club on loan till the end of the season from Aston Villa.

5 February 2011 saw Newcastle pull off a remarkable comeback against Arsenal at St James' Park. Theo Walcott gave Arsenal a 1–0 lead inside just 43 seconds, Johan Djourou put Arsenal 2–0 up on three minutes, then Robin van Persie added insult to injury with a third goal inside the tenth minute. Arsenal went in at half time 4–0 up after another goal from Van Persie, however early in the second half Arsenal's Abou Diaby was shown a straight red card for pushing Midfielders Joey Barton and Kevin Nolan after what he felt to be a bad tackle in which replays showed was legal. It was all downhill for Arsenal from there. Barton slipped a coolly taken penalty in to make 4–1, then Leon Best made it 4–2 with a thumping close range effort not long after a goal he scored just before had been judged offside. Another penalty gave Newcastle hope with Barton scoring again, and the returning midfielder Cheick Tioté scored a phenomenal volley from 30 yards to give Newcastle a well-deserved point with the final score being a massive 4–4 draw. This was the first time any Premier League club had ever come back from being 4–0. Newcastle were not beaten by Arsenal in the 2010–11 Premier League season, having beating them 1–0 at the Emirates Stadium earlier in the season under Chris Hughton's management.

On 10 February 2011, former Finland international Shefki Kuqi joined Newcastle for the remainder of the season.

Newcastle finished in 12th place, a reasonable position on the team's first year back, but slightly tempered after the team looked set to finish ninth until they threw away a 3–0 lead against West Brom on the final day of the season.

Chronological list of events
5 July 2010: Newcastle United complete the signing of Nottingham Forest defender James Perch.

22 July 2010: Dan Gosling signs on a four-year contract.

23 July 2010: Squad numbers are announced for the coming season.

28 July 2010: Sol Campbell signs on a one-year contract.

3 August 2010: Newcastle United win the Teresa Herrera Trophy after a 5–3 penalty shootout victory over Deportivo de La Coruña.

16 August 2010: 1,800 Newcastle fans travel to Old Trafford for Newcastle's first game back in the Premier League, a 3–0 loss at the hands of Manchester United.

22 August 2010: Sky Sports report Newcastle have agreed a deal with Twente for Ivorian international Cheick Tioté.

22 August 2010: Newcastle win their first home game of the season with Andy Carroll scoring a hat-trick in a 6–0 victory at home to Aston Villa.

25 August 2010: Newcastle release a statement saying that Steven Taylor has been placed on the transfer list, with the 24-year-old defender failing to agree to a contract extension, apparently asking for wages of £60,000 a week.

27 August 2010: Newcastle confirm the signing of Cheick Tioté.

28 August 2010: Newcastle confirm the signing of midfielder Hatem Ben Arfa from Marseille on a season-long loan with a view to a permanent transfer.

1 September 2010: The transfer window shuts with no more signings being made by Newcastle, and Steven Taylor remains without a new contract.
11 September 2010: Newcastle's 26-game unbeaten home record at St James' Park is ended with a 2–0 loss to Blackpool.

18 September 2010: Hatem Ben Arfa scores on his first start for Newcastle in a 1–0 win at Everton, their first at Goodison Park in nine years.

22 September 2010: Newcastle cause one of the biggest upsets of the League Cup third round, knocking out last season's double winners, Chelsea, 4–3 at Stamford Bridge, Newcastle's first win at Stamford Bridge since November 1986. Nile Ranger, Ryan Taylor and Shola Ameobi (2) score to send Newcastle into the fourth round; Patrick van Aanholt and Nicolas Anelka (2) score Chelsea's goals.

3 October 2010: Hatem Ben Arfa is ruled out until March at the earliest with a broken leg, after a tackle by Manchester City player Nigel de Jong in a 2–1 loss at Eastlands.

25 October 2010: Andy Carroll's court case for attacking a man in Newcastle's Blu Bambu sees him fined £1,000 and ordered to pay £2,500 compensation.

27 October 2010: Newcastle are eliminated from the League Cup at the last-16 stage with a 4–0 trouncing by Arsenal, after a Tim Krul own goal, two goals from Theo Walcott and another by Nicklas Bendtner. After the game, Chris Hughton revealed that the club were standing by him and were to open negotiation talks for a new contract, but not until the end of this year.

31 October 2010: Halloween on Tyneside sees the return of the Tyne-Wear derby, with Sunderland visiting St James' Park. Newcastle thrash Sunderland 5–1 with a hat-trick by Kevin Nolan and two goals by Shola Ameobi.

11 November 2010: Newcastle and Joey Barton accept the FA's charges brought against him for punching Blackburn Rovers winger Morten Gamst Pedersen. Barton is banned for three matches.

17 November 2010: Andy Carroll makes his debut for England in a 2–1 defeat by France, starting up front on his own in a 4–5–1 formation, with Sunderland midfielder Jordan Henderson and Arsenal left-back Kieran Gibbs. He plays for 70 minutes before being replaced by Cardiff City striker and fellow debutant Jay Bothroyd, also making his debut. England coach Fabio Capello later reveals Carroll will definitely be in the next England squad.

20 November 2010: Newcastle United are thrashed 5–1 by Bolton Wanderers at the Reebok Stadium. Kevin Davies, Lee Chung-yong and Johan Elmander all score for Bolton before Andy Carroll pulls one back for the Tynesiders, but after another goal from Elmander Fabricio Coloccini is sent off for elbowing the Swedish striker. Davies compounds Newcastle's misery with a 90th-minute penalty. To make matters worse for Newcastle, Mike Williamson is suspended for the games against Chelsea, West Bromwich Albion and Liverpool after a review of a challenge he made during the match.

6 December 2010: The club announce they have sacked Chris Hughton.

9 December 2010: Alan Pardew is appointed as the new manager of Newcastle, signing a deal until 2016.

11 December 2010: Pardew's first game in charge ends in victory as Newcastle beat Liverpool 3–1 at home with goals from Kevin Nolan, Joey Barton and Andy Carroll.

5 January 2011: Sky Sports report Newcastle have agreed a deal with Marseille to sign Hatem Ben Arfa on a four-and-a-half-year deal.

5 January 2011: Leon Best scores a hat-trick, his first goals for Newcastle, as the Toon thrash Premier League strugglers West Ham United 5–0.

8 January 2011: Newcastle are eliminated from the FA Cup by League Two side Stevenage – in their first ever season in the Football League – with a 3–1 loss at Broadhall Way.

31 January 2011: Liverpool purchase striker Andy Carroll for a club record fee of £35 million. Liverpool's initial bid of £30 million was rejected, as was their improved offer of £35 million, but this was eventually accepted after Carroll handed in a transfer request.

31 January 2011: Newcastle sign Aston Villa midfielder Stephen Ireland on loan until the end of the season.

5 February 2011: Newcastle witness the greatest Premier League comeback of all time at St James' Park as Arsenal visit Tyneside. Arsenal are 3–0 up within ten minutes and 4–0 up by half-time, but the sending off of Abou Diaby proved to be a turning point. Two Joey Barton penalties sandwiching a goal from Leon Best gave Newcastle unlikely hope for somehow gaining a point, before Cheick Tioté smashed in a 30-yard volley to make the score 4–4. Newcastle could have improbably yet gained all three points, but Kevin Nolan's late strike on goal was inches wide. Nonetheless, securing a point which, for 45 minutes, looked unbelievably impossible to salvage, was something for Newcastle to be proud of.
10 February 2011: Newcastle sign Finnish striker Shefki Kuqi until the end of the season.

7 May 2011: Newcastle's penultimate home game of the season saw them secure Premier League safety with a hard-fought 2–1 victory over Birmingham City.
22 May 2011: On the final day of the 2010–11 Premier League season, Newcastle welcomed West Bromwich Albion to St James' Park. Newcastle led 3–0 through Steven Taylor, Peter Løvenkrands and an own goal from Jonas Olsson, but threw it away to eventually draw 3–3, with Somen Tchoyi scoring a hat-trick for the Baggies.

Club

Coaching staff

Team kit
The kit designer will be Puma and the sponsor will be Northern Rock. Leaks were released earlier in May showing a new black and white home kit, a blue away kit and a white third kit. These leaks were confirmed on 18 June 2010.

Players

First-team
Squad at end of season

Left club during season

Reserves
The following players did not appear for the first team this season.

Youth team

Trialists
The following players came to Newcastle as trialists this season.

Transfers

In

 Total spending:  ~ £12,000,000

Out

 Total income:  ~ £35,000,000

Loans in

Loans out

Statistics

Appearances, goals and cards
Last updated on 22 May 2011.
(Substitute appearances in brackets)

Starting formations
Last updated on 22 May 2011.

Captains
Last updated on 22 May 2011.

Competitions

Pre-season

League

FA Cup

League Cup

Matches

Pre-season

League

FA Cup

League Cup

References

Newcastle United F.C. seasons
Newcastle United